"Surprise, Surprise (Sweet Bird of Paradox)" is a song written by John Lennon that was first released on his 1974 album Walls and Bridges.  Elton John contributes harmony vocals to the song.

Lyrics and music
"Surprise, Surprise (Sweet Bird of Paradox)" was the first song Lennon wrote for Walls and Bridges. While other songs on the album were inspired by Lennon's feelings towards his then estranged wife Yoko Ono, "Surprise, Surprise (Sweet Bird of Paradox)" was inspired by his feelings towards his then lover May Pang, and how she helped him through that difficult period.  The term "sweet bird of paradox" in the title is a play on the term "bird of paradise" and refers to the paradox that Lennon had originally intended Pang to be a placeholder while he was separated from Ono but she became important to him.  While the final version of the song reflects Lennon's happiness with his relationship with Pang, the earliest versions of the song had him questioning the strength of this relationship.

Music critic Johnny Rogan suggested that although "Surprise, Surprise (Sweet Bird of Paradox)" is a love song to May Pang, it contains hints that the relationship is merely functional and that the line "She makes me sweat and forget who I am" suggests that Pang "deadens [Lennon's] true feelings.  Music lecturers Ben Urish and Ken Bielen claim that in contrast to expressing the "dawning realization that love was meant to be", as in Lennon's earlier song "Out the Blue", in "Surprise, Surprise (Sweet Bird of Paradox)" Lennon expresses the "sudden astonishment of self-centered lust."  They explain that Lennon does this by using "marginally connected phrases to approximate the excitement that causes the thoughts to leap ahead of themselves, and their expression to be disrupted as a result."  Urish and Bielen give as examples the phrases "Natural high...butterfly," "Just like a willow tree...a breath of spring," and "A bird of paradise...sunrise in her eyes."

An inspiration for the music of the song was the Diamonds' 1957 hit "Little Darlin'".  As the song fades out, Lennon sings "sweet, sweet, sweet, sweet love" to a tune similar to that to which the Beatles sang "Beep, beep! Beep, beep, yeah!" during the fadeout of "Drive My Car."

Elton John was originally intended to sing the vocals as a duet with Lennon, but struggled to match Lennon's phrasing.  He expressed the frustration of his efforts, saying "People were leaving the room. Razor blades were being passed out!”  Lennon ended up overdubbing Elton John's harmony vocals onto the middle eight.  A horn part was also overdubbed.

Reception
Rolling Stone critic Ben Gerson said that "Surprise, Surprise (Sweet Bird of Paradox)" shows that "Lennon is resilient and can still love," but in doing so contradict the themes of other songs on Walls and Bridges, in which Lennon claims to be in great pain.  Lennon eventually came to regard the song as "Just a piece of garbage," although Rogan points out that this assessment may have been motivated by the fact that he was back with Ono by that time.

Alternate version
An early version of "Surprise, Surprise (Sweet Bird of Paradox)" was released on the 1998 compilation album John Lennon Anthology.  Beatle biographers Chip Madinger and Mark Easter prefer the Anthology version due to lacking Elton John's harmony vocal, which they view as "clumsy", having a faster tempo, and a more prominent clavinet part.

References

1974 songs
Songs written by John Lennon
Song recordings produced by John Lennon
John Lennon songs
Redirects from songs